The North Saskatchewan River is a glacier-fed river that flows from the Canadian Rockies continental divide east to central Saskatchewan, where it joins with the South Saskatchewan River to make up the Saskatchewan River. Its water flows eventually into the Hudson Bay.

The Saskatchewan River system is the largest shared between the Canadian provinces of Alberta and Saskatchewan. Its watershed includes most of southern and central Alberta and Saskatchewan.

Course

The river begins above  at the toe of the Saskatchewan Glacier in the Columbia Icefield, and flows southeast through Banff National Park alongside the Icefields Parkway. At this point, it turns north where it eventually arrives at Abraham Lake. Bighorn Dam constricts the north end of Abraham Lake, where the North Saskatchewan emerges to track eastward to Rocky Mountain House. At Rocky Mountain House, the river abruptly turns north again for  where it switches east towards Edmonton, Alberta. 

In Edmonton, the river passes through the centre of the city in a northeasterly direction and out towards Smoky Lake at which point it quickly changes to the southeast and then more to the east as it makes its way to the Alberta–Saskatchewan boundary.

From the border, the river flows southeast between North Battleford and Battleford and on in the direction of Saskatoon. From there, the river flows east to Tobin Lake and into Manitoba, eventually emptying into Lake Winnipeg.

Geography
The river course can be divided into five distinct sections. The first, the eastern slopes of the Rocky Mountains, is the smallest area geographically, although the largest in terms of run-off and contributed water flow. The glaciers and perpetual snows of the mountain peaks feed the river year-round. Mountains, with little vegetation, experience fast-melting snow cover. The second section of the river comprises the foothills region. The terrain is hilly and rough, with a deeper and more defined valley. This area is well covered with forest and muskeg, and run-off into the river is much more constant and stable than in the mountains.

From Edmonton to the mouth of the Vermilion River, the North Saskatchewan flows through the plains-parkland divide, with occasional stretches of prairie. The North Saskatchewan River valley parks system; the largest expanses of urban parkland in Canada. Cutting across Edmonton and the Capital Region. The river runs in a well-defined valley with deep cuts in the landscape. The fourth section, from the Vermilion River to Prince Albert is principally prairie with a few small stretches of timber and secondary forest cover. The valley of the river is much wider, and the river itself spreads out across shallow water and flows over many shifting sand bars. Low-lying, flat areas border the river for much of this section.

The final section of the river, from Prince Albert to the Saskatchewan River Forks, has many rapids. The valley is more shallow than the previous sections of the river, and the channel is much better defined. There is little prairie and much tree cover in this section.

The water flows on then in the Saskatchewan River.

Geology

The Bridge River Ash is in the vicinity of the North Saskatchewan River, which erupted from the Mount Meager massif in southwestern British Columbia about 2350 years ago.

History
The river is shown on a Hudson's Bay Company (HBC) map from 1760, labelled as the Beaver River.

Its Cree name is  'swift current'. From this name is derived the name Saskatchewan, used as well for the South Saskatchewan River and the Saskatchewan River (to which the North Saskatchewan is a major tributary), and the province of that name.

Its Blackfoot name is  'big river'.

The section of the North Saskatchewan river that falls within the Banff National Park boundaries has been designated a Canadian heritage river in 1989, for its importance in the development of western Canada.

The river demarcates the prairie–parkland divide for much of its course and acted as a natural boundary between plains Blackfoot and woodland Cree for thousands of years. With the westward expansion of the fur trade spearheaded by the North West Company (NWC) and followed by the HBC, the river became an important transportation route for fur trade brigades' York boats, to which it was especially well suited as it follows an eastern trend toward Hudson Bay, the entry point for the HBC into Canada. Many fur trade posts were constructed on the river, including Fort Edmonton (1795) and Rocky Mountain House, the uppermost post reached by canoe navigation. The river's importance continued after the amalgamation of the HBC and the NWC. The river was plied by a number of steamboats right up to the First World War, although for everyday freight the growing web of railway lines in the western prairies eventually replaced them. The river was used commercially for many years to carry flatboats of settlers goods and construction materials downstream from Edmonton, to float thousands of logs in the annual log drive downstream to Edmonton prior to the First World War, as a source of ice blocks for home owners' iceboxes.

The first bridge across the river opened in 1900, the Low Level Bridge (Edmonton). The Canadian Northern Railway Bridge (Prince Albert) (1907-9), which also at first carried foot and wheeled traffic, and the Battleford bridge (ca. 1908) followed.

Recreation

Edmonton's North Saskatchewan River valley parks system is the largest system of urban parks in Canada, and covers both sides of the river valley's course through Edmonton.

Fish species
Fish species include: walleye, sauger, yellow perch, northern pike, goldeye, mooneye, lake sturgeon, mountain whitefish, burbot, longnose sucker, white sucker and shorthead redhorse.  The upper North Saskatchewan River contains cutthroat trout (although not native),  and bull trout

Flooding
Like all rivers, the North Saskatchewan is subject to periodic flooding, beginning with rapid snowmelt in the mountains or prolonged periods of rain in the river basin. With the establishment of permanent communities along the river's course, and the rise of an administrative/government structure, records exist recording floods in the North Saskatchewan for the past century. The Bighorn Dam, constructed in the early 1970s near Nordegg, Alberta, and the Brazeau Dam, constructed in the mid-1960s, have not reduced flooding potential on the North Saskatchewan River (Alberta Environment 1981)

List of notable flood years

Flood of 1899

Flood of 1915

The 1915 flood of the North Saskatchewan River was one of the most dramatic in the history of Edmonton. On 28 June, the Edmonton Bulletin reported the river had risen "10 feet in as many hours." A frantic phone call from Rocky Mountain House alerted local authorities to the flood's arrival. The Canadian Northern Railway had parked a number of train cars on the city's Low Level Bridge to protect against the "tons upon tons of debris" that had been pushed up against its piers, including a house swept away by the current. Thousands of Edmonton residents watched the flood destroy lumber mills along the city's river valley.

Flood of 1986

2013 Alberta Flooding
Along with many other rivers in central and southern Alberta during late June, the  North Saskatchewan saw significantly higher water levels and flow rates. However, due to the expansive North Saskatchewan River Valley and natural sanctuary/parkland that surrounds it, the City of Edmonton had only minor, isolated flooding, with virtually no major property damage as a result.

Commercial navigation
The North Saskatchewan River has always been a major trade route from Hudson Bay and central Canada across the Canadian Prairies to the Canadian Rockies. During the fur trade era, birch bark canoes and York boats travelled up and down the Saskatchewan delivering trade goods and amassing furs for transportation to Europe.

The North Saskatchewan also witnessed a lively, although short-lived, era of steamboat shipping during the 1870s, 1880s, and 1890s. The Hudson's Bay Company (HBC) purchased a number of steamboats from companies operating on the Red River and trading at Winnipeg/Fort Garry. The HBC desired to avoid paying the labour costs of fur trade brigades, and hoped steamboat shipping would provide a suitable alternative. Several HBC steamboats navigated the river intermittently for many years, although fluctuating water levels and natural barriers (rapids and sandbars) hampered efficient operation.

With the arrival of the railroad in Western Canada, steamboat shipping on the North Saskatchewan tapered off, but steamboats operated in the Edmonton area until the economic crash of 1912-14.

Dams and hydroelectric development
A number of dams have been planned and constructed on the North Saskatchewan River and its tributaries. No singular purpose has dominated dam planning in the basin, indeed, hydroelectric development, flood control, and water diversion schemes have all underpinned proposals to construct dams on the river.

Planned dams

The first hydroelectric development on the North Saskatchewan was planned in 1910 near the Town of Drayton Valley. Funding for the plan came from a British syndicate; design and construction were to be carried out by the Edmonton Hydro-Electric Power Scheme. The development was shelved after the outbreak of World War I.

The La Colle Falls hydroelectric project east of Prince Albert was a half-built failure. Construction began in the 1910s and was later abandoned. The city remained in debt from financing the project until 1960, and the site still attracts tourists today.

This dam was part of a larger interbasin water diversion conceived by the Alberta Government to transfer water from the Peace, Smoky, and Athabasca rivers to the Saskatchewan River Basin.

The reservoir would have affected municipal water works in the City of Fort Saskatchewan, was likely to inundate part of the Saddle Lake Indian reserve, and would have flooded a number of oil and natural gas fields in the area. The plan was later shelved in light of economic and environmental concerns.

Constructed dams

The Bighorn Dam was constructed near Nordegg and created Abraham Lake, one of the largest reservoirs in Alberta. The dam was constructed in 1972 by Calgary Power. The Bighorn Plant has a generating capacity of 120 megawatts (MW), and has an available water supply that allows it to be the largest producer of hydroelectric electricity in Alberta, with an average of 408,000 megawatt hours (MW⋅h) each year.

One of the North Saskatchewan's major tributaries, the Brazeau River, houses the Brazeau Hydroelectric Plant. At 355 MW, the Brazeau Dam is Alberta's largest hydroelectric facility, and was built in 1965 by Calgary Power.  Though having a higher peak generating capacity than the Bighorn Dam, the hydrology of the Brazeau means that its average annual electricity production is a slightly smaller 397,000 MW⋅h.

Tributaries

Saskatchewan Glacier to Abraham Lake
 Nigel Creek
 Alexandra River
 Norman Creek
 Rampart Creek
 Arctomy's Creek
 Castleguard River
 Howse River
 Glacier River
 Mistaya River
 Peyto Lake
 Owen Creek
 Thompson Creek
 Corona Creek
 Spreading Creek
 Wildhorse Creek
 Loudon Creek
 Siffleur River
 Escarpment River
 Two O'Clock Creek
 Bridge Creek
 Whiterabbit Creek

Abraham Lake to Rocky Mountain House
 Canyon Creek
 Cline River
 Pinto Lake
 Whitegoat Creek
 BATUS Creek
 Hoodoo Creek
 Allstones Creek
 Mud Creek
 Tershishner Creek
 Crooked Creek
 Kidd Creek
 Bighorn River
 Black Canyon Creek
 South Creek
 Dutch Creek
 Jock Creek
 Gap Creek
 Deep Creek
 Shunda Creek
 Jack Fish Creek
 Camp Creek
 Lundine Creek
 Lewis Creek
 Rough Creek
 Ram River
 North Ram River
 Cow Creek
 Cow Lake
 Clearwater River

Rocky Mountain House to Edmonton
 Chicken Creek
 Little Beaver Creek
 Big Beaver Creek
 No Name Creek
 Baptiste River
 Brazeau River
  Southesk River, Cardinal River, Blackstone River, Elk River, Nordegg River
 Sand Creek
 Wolf Creek
 Washout Creek
 Mishow Creek
 Poplar Modeste Creek
 Tomahawk Creek
 Shoal Lakes Creek
 Wabamum Creek
 Wabamum Lake
 Strawberry Creek
 Weed Creek
 Willow Creek
 Cutbank Creek
 Conjuring Creek
 Wizard Lake
 Whitemud Creek
 Blackmud Creek
 Mill Creek Ravine

Edmonton to Alberta-Saskatchewan Border
 Rat Creek
 Oldman Creek
 Horsehills Creek
 Ross Creek
 Sturgeon River
 Big Lake
 Redwater River
 Beaverhill Creek
 Waskatenau Creek
 Egg Creek
 Smoky Creek
 White Earth Creek
 Redclay Creek
 Cucumber Creek
 Saddlelake Creek
 Lake Eliza Creek
 Siler Creek
 Gideon Lake
 Death River
 Antimose Creek
 Telegraph Creek
 Moosehills Creek
 Mooswa Creek
 Middle Creek
 Borden Lake, Laurier Lake, Ross Lake, Whitney Lake
 Frog Creek
 Alma Creek
 Vermilion River
 Chester Creek
 Two Hills Creek
 Cabin Lake
 Mosquito Creek
 Fulton Creek

Saskatchewan
 Pipestone Creek
 Oldman Creek
 Monnery River
 Muskeg Creek
 Whitesand Creek
 Englishman River
 Big Gulley Creek
 Birling Creek
 Turtle Lake River
 Jackfish River
 Battle River
 Cooper Creek
 Baljennie Creek
 Eagle Creek
 Pakrowka Creek
 Shepherds Creek
 Turtle Creek
 Cee Pee Creek
 Radouga Creek
 Steep Creek
 Miners Creek
 Sturgeon River
 Shell River
 Spruce River
 Garden River

Photo gallery

See also 
 List of crossings of the North Saskatchewan River
 List of longest rivers of Canada
 List of rivers of Alberta
 List of rivers of Saskatchewan
 Saskatchewan River fur trade

Further reading

References

External links
 North Saskatchewan Watershed Alliance - designated Watershed Planning and Advisory Council
 Encyclopedia of Saskatchewan

 
Canadian Heritage Rivers
Rivers of Alberta
Rivers of Saskatchewan
Rivers of the Canadian Rockies
Tributaries of Hudson Bay